The 1963 British Formula Junior season was the fourth and last season of the British Formula Junior motor racing. It featured the B.A.R.C. Express & Star British Championship which was won by Peter Arundell by just one point.

The 1963 season included only one championship, rather than the two held the previous season. The category was replaced by Formula Three in 1964.

B.A.R.C. Express & Star British Championship

Champion:  Peter Arundell

Runner Up:  Denny Hulme

Results

Table

References

British Formula Three Championship seasons
Formula Three
Formula Junior